Franz Pfaudler (1893–1956) was an Austrian stage and film actor.

Selected filmography
 My Life for Maria Isabella (1935)
 Renate in the Quartet (1939)
 Der Postmeister (1940)
 Heimkehr (1941)
 Anuschka (1942)
 Schrammeln (1944)
 Melusine (1944)
 The Millionaire (1947)
 Maresi (1948)
 Eroica (1949)
 Archduke Johann's Great Love (1950)
 Franz Schubert (1953)
 The Vulture Wally (1956)

References

Bibliography 
 Giesen, Rolf.  Nazi Propaganda Films: A History and Filmography. McFarland, 2003.

External links 
 

1893 births
1956 deaths
Male actors from Vienna
Austrian male film actors
Austrian male stage actors
Burials at Ottakring Cemetery